Dallas SWAT is an American reality television series that premiered January 5, 2006, on A&E. It tracks the day-to-day operations of the Dallas police department's SWAT team. The series aired over three seasons on A&E. During its time, Detroit and Kansas City, Missouri were also featured beginning in the second season.

Episodes

Season 1 (2006)

Season 2 (2006-07)

Season 3 (2007)

References

External links
 

2000s American reality television series
2006 American television series debuts
2007 American television series endings
A&E (TV network) original programming
English-language television shows
Television shows set in Dallas